Patrick Sharp (born 1981) is a Canadian ice hockey player.

Patrick Sharp may also refer to:
Patrick Sharp (theologian) (died 1615), Scottish theologian
Pat Sharp (born 1961), British radio and television presenter